Nguyễn Ngọc Duy (born 4 July 1986) is a Vietnamese retired professional footballer who played as an midfielder.

Career 
He started training when he was 13 years old. Duy is one of two most players (with Trịnh Quang Vinh) in training with U-19 The Cong at Bulgaria (2006). He has been known since 2008 V-League, he was a component of Thể Công when his team had the flourish time on that season, topped the league table but they was touched in eighth-placed. He is said to "not have high fitness" but "has a good speed with ingenious left foot so he's very dangerous when playing at left-back".

On December 30, 2008, Ngoc Duy wall called to Vietnam by coach Henrique Calisto to prepare for the match in 2011 AFC Asian Cup qualification against Lebanon and China.

Honours 
Hà Nội
 V.League 1: 2010, 2013

References 

1986 births
Living people
Vietnamese footballers
Hanoi FC players
V.League 1 players
Vietnam international footballers
Sportspeople from Hanoi
Association football midfielders
Viettel FC players
21st-century Vietnamese people